The 1951 VFL season was the 55th season of the Victorian Football League (VFL), the highest level senior Australian rules football competition in Victoria. The season featured twelve clubs, ran from 21 April until 29 September, and comprised an 18-game home-and-away season followed by a finals series featuring the top four clubs.

The premiership was won by the Geelong Football Club for the fourth time, after it defeated  by eleven points in the 1951 VFL Grand Final.

Premiership season
In 1951, the VFL competition consisted of twelve teams of 18 on-the-field players each, plus two substitute players, known as the 19th man and the 20th man. A player could be substituted for any reason; however, once substituted, a player could not return to the field of play under any circumstances.

Teams played each other in a home-and-away season of 18 rounds; matches 12 to 18 were the "home-and-way reverse" of matches 1 to 7.

Once the 18 round home-and-away season had finished, the 1951 VFL Premiers were determined by the specific format and conventions of the Page–McIntyre system.

Round 1

|- bgcolor="#CCCCFF"
| Home team
| Home team score
| Away team
| Away team score
| Venue
| Crowd
| Date
|- bgcolor="#FFFFFF"
| 
| 13.17 (95)
| 
| 6.5 (41)
| Kardinia Park
| 22,000
| 21 April 1951
|- bgcolor="#FFFFFF"
| 
| 13.8 (86)
| 
| 10.16 (76)
| Windy Hill
| 24,000
| 21 April 1951
|- bgcolor="#FFFFFF"
| 
| 20.21 (141)
| 
| 7.6 (48)
| Victoria Park
| 23,000
| 21 April 1951
|- bgcolor="#FFFFFF"
| 
| 13.9 (87)
| 
| 7.15 (57)
| Princes Park
| 13,000
| 21 April 1951
|- bgcolor="#FFFFFF"
| 
| 15.9 (99)
| 
| 15.10 (100)
| Punt Road Oval
| 22,000
| 21 April 1951
|- bgcolor="#FFFFFF"
| 
| 10.18 (78)
| 
| 16.12 (108)
| Junction Oval
| 27,000
| 21 April 1951

Round 2

|- bgcolor="#CCCCFF"
| Home team
| Home team score
| Away team
| Away team score
| Venue
| Crowd
| Date
|- bgcolor="#FFFFFF"
| 
| 8.14 (62)
| 
| 12.9 (81)
| Arden Street Oval
| 13,000
| 28 April 1951
|- bgcolor="#FFFFFF"
| 
| 12.11 (83)
| 
| 10.7 (67)
| Brunswick Street Oval
| 18,000
| 28 April 1951
|- bgcolor="#FFFFFF"
| 
| 5.7 (37)
| 
| 14.13 (97)
| Lake Oval
| 18,000
| 28 April 1951
|- bgcolor="#FFFFFF"
| 
| 9.7 (61)
| 
| 12.14 (86)
| Glenferrie Oval
| 12,000
| 28 April 1951
|- bgcolor="#FFFFFF"
| 
| 7.15 (57)
| 
| 15.16 (106)
| MCG
| 37,000
| 28 April 1951
|- bgcolor="#FFFFFF"
| 
| 5.11 (41)
| 
| 4.16 (40)
| Western Oval
| 26,000
| 28 April 1951

Round 3

|- bgcolor="#CCCCFF"
| Home team
| Home team score
| Away team
| Away team score
| Venue
| Crowd
| Date
|- bgcolor="#FFFFFF"
| 
| 12.15 (87)
| 
| 9.10 (64)
| Glenferrie Oval
| 10,000
| 5 May 1951
|- bgcolor="#FFFFFF"
| 
| 10.9 (69)
| 
| 5.13 (43)
| Western Oval
| 20,000
| 5 May 1951
|- bgcolor="#FFFFFF"
| 
| 14.18 (102)
| 
| 7.8 (50)
| Victoria Park
| 24,500
| 5 May 1951
|- bgcolor="#FFFFFF"
| 
| 12.12 (84)
| 
| 16.12 (108)
| Princes Park
| 28,000
| 5 May 1951
|- bgcolor="#FFFFFF"
| 
| 8.12 (60)
| 
| 12.12 (84)
| MCG
| 21,500
| 5 May 1951
|- bgcolor="#FFFFFF"
| 
| 14.20 (104)
| 
| 14.7 (91)
| Lake Oval
| 14,000
| 5 May 1951

Round 4

|- bgcolor="#CCCCFF"
| Home team
| Home team score
| Away team
| Away team score
| Venue
| Crowd
| Date
|- bgcolor="#FFFFFF"
| 
| 12.6 (78)
| 
| 9.19 (73)
| Arden Street Oval
| 15,000
| 12 May 1951
|- bgcolor="#FFFFFF"
| 
| 10.10 (70)
| 
| 6.16 (52)
| Brunswick Street Oval
| 20,500
| 12 May 1951
|- bgcolor="#FFFFFF"
| 
| 15.8 (98)
| 
| 14.7 (91)
| Junction Oval
| 15,000
| 12 May 1951
|- bgcolor="#FFFFFF"
| 
| 17.18 (120)
| 
| 7.14 (56)
| Punt Road Oval
| 15,000
| 12 May 1951
|- bgcolor="#FFFFFF"
| 
| 12.11 (83)
| 
| 5.14 (44)
| Windy Hill
| 35,000
| 12 May 1951
|- bgcolor="#FFFFFF"
| 
| 14.7 (91)
| 
| 9.13 (67)
| Kardinia Park
| 20,500
| 12 May 1951

Round 5

|- bgcolor="#CCCCFF"
| Home team
| Home team score
| Away team
| Away team score
| Venue
| Crowd
| Date
|- bgcolor="#FFFFFF"
| 
| 7.18 (60)
| 
| 14.14 (98)
| Glenferrie Oval
| 9,000
| 19 May 1951
|- bgcolor="#FFFFFF"
| 
| 11.15 (81)
| 
| 7.11 (53)
| Western Oval
| 18,000
| 19 May 1951
|- bgcolor="#FFFFFF"
| 
| 19.15 (129)
| 
| 10.12 (72)
| Princes Park
| 24,500
| 19 May 1951
|- bgcolor="#FFFFFF"
| 
| 15.6 (96)
| 
| 11.12 (78)
| Lake Oval
| 16,000
| 19 May 1951
|- bgcolor="#FFFFFF"
| 
| 14.12 (96)
| 
| 10.8 (68)
| Kardinia Park
| 24,500
| 19 May 1951
|- bgcolor="#FFFFFF"
| 
| 16.20 (116)
| 
| 9.11 (65)
| Punt Road Oval
| 38,000
| 19 May 1951

Round 6

|- bgcolor="#CCCCFF"
| Home team
| Home team score
| Away team
| Away team score
| Venue
| Crowd
| Date
|- bgcolor="#FFFFFF"
| 
| 13.15 (93)
| 
| 6.10 (46)
| Victoria Park
| 19,000
| 2 June 1951
|- bgcolor="#FFFFFF"
| 
| 18.9 (117)
| 
| 19.12 (126)
| Junction Oval
| 20,000
| 2 June 1951
|- bgcolor="#FFFFFF"
| 
| 11.8 (74)
| 
| 12.16 (88)
| Arden Street Oval
| 15,000
| 2 June 1951
|- bgcolor="#FFFFFF"
| 
| 9.16 (70)
| 
| 7.17 (59)
| Glenferrie Oval
| 10,000
| 2 June 1951
|- bgcolor="#FFFFFF"
| 
| 14.7 (91)
| 
| 9.14 (68)
| Brunswick Street Oval
| 24,000
| 2 June 1951
|- bgcolor="#FFFFFF"
| 
| 11.12 (78)
| 
| 8.10 (58)
| MCG
| 30,000
| 2 June 1951

Round 7

|- bgcolor="#CCCCFF"
| Home team
| Home team score
| Away team
| Away team score
| Venue
| Crowd
| Date
|- bgcolor="#FFFFFF"
| 
| 20.13 (133)
| 
| 8.15 (63)
| Kardinia Park
| 20,000
| 9 June 1951
|- bgcolor="#FFFFFF"
| 
| 13.19 (97)
| 
| 11.12 (78)
| Victoria Park
| 20,000
| 9 June 1951
|- bgcolor="#FFFFFF"
| 
| 11.9 (75)
| 
| 13.12 (90)
| Windy Hill
| 30,000
| 9 June 1951
|- bgcolor="#FFFFFF"
| 
| 9.13 (67)
| 
| 12.9 (81)
| MCG
| 51,000
| 11 June 1951
|- bgcolor="#FFFFFF"
| 
| 6.15 (51)
| 
| 12.12 (84)
| Brunswick Street Oval
| 17,000
| 11 June 1951
|- bgcolor="#FFFFFF"
| 
| 17.14 (116)
| 
| 9.15 (69)
| Lake Oval
| 17,000
| 11 June 1951

Round 8

|- bgcolor="#CCCCFF"
| Home team
| Home team score
| Away team
| Away team score
| Venue
| Crowd
| Date
|- bgcolor="#FFFFFF"
| 
| 9.5 (59)
| 
| 11.11 (77)
| Western Oval
| 19,500
| 16 June 1951
|- bgcolor="#FFFFFF"
| 
| 15.13 (103)
| 
| 12.7 (79)
| Windy Hill
| 15,000
| 16 June 1951
|- bgcolor="#FFFFFF"
| 
| 7.11 (53)
| 
| 9.13 (67)
| Princes Park
| 31,000
| 16 June 1951
|- bgcolor="#FFFFFF"
| 
| 14.9 (93)
| 
| 6.12 (48)
| Arden Street Oval
| 13,000
| 16 June 1951
|- bgcolor="#FFFFFF"
| 
| 12.14 (86)
| 
| 7.11 (53)
| Lake Oval
| 8,500
| 16 June 1951
|- bgcolor="#FFFFFF"
| 
| 9.12 (66)
| 
| 12.16 (88)
| Punt Road Oval
| 26,000
| 16 June 1951

Round 9

|- bgcolor="#CCCCFF"
| Home team
| Home team score
| Away team
| Away team score
| Venue
| Crowd
| Date
|- bgcolor="#FFFFFF"
| 
| 10.14 (74)
| 
| 8.8 (56)
| Kardinia Park
| 32,000
| 23 June 1951
|- bgcolor="#FFFFFF"
| 
| 12.13 (85)
| 
| 12.13 (85)
| Brunswick Street Oval
| 18,000
| 23 June 1951
|- bgcolor="#FFFFFF"
| 
| 5.19 (49)
| 
| 23.14 (152)
| MCG
| 18,500
| 23 June 1951
|- bgcolor="#FFFFFF"
| 
| 8.11 (59)
| 
| 13.13 (91)
| Arden Street Oval
| 24,000
| 23 June 1951
|- bgcolor="#FFFFFF"
| 
| 8.9 (57)
| 
| 13.7 (85)
| Glenferrie Oval
| 12,000
| 23 June 1951
|- bgcolor="#FFFFFF"
| 
| 9.11 (65)
| 
| 15.15 (105)
| Junction Oval
| 17,000
| 23 June 1951

Round 10

|- bgcolor="#CCCCFF"
| Home team
| Home team score
| Away team
| Away team score
| Venue
| Crowd
| Date
|- bgcolor="#FFFFFF"
| 
| 7.7 (49)
| 
| 13.15 (93)
| Junction Oval
| 21,000
| 30 June 1951
|- bgcolor="#FFFFFF"
| 
| 10.12 (72)
| 
| 12.5 (77)
| Victoria Park
| 25,000
| 30 June 1951
|- bgcolor="#FFFFFF"
| 
| 14.20 (104)
| 
| 5.10 (40)
| Princes Park
| 22,000
| 30 June 1951
|- bgcolor="#FFFFFF"
| 
| 10.14 (74)
| 
| 11.9 (75)
| Brunswick Street Oval
| 8,500
| 7 July 1951
|- bgcolor="#FFFFFF"
| 
| 10.14 (74)
| 
| 10.10 (70)
| Windy Hill
| 30,000
| 7 July 1951
|- bgcolor="#FFFFFF"
| 
| 7.7 (49)
| 
| 12.12 (84)
| MCG
| 22,500
| 7 July 1951

Round 11

|- bgcolor="#CCCCFF"
| Home team
| Home team score
| Away team
| Away team score
| Venue
| Crowd
| Date
|- bgcolor="#FFFFFF"
| 
| 18.12 (120)
| 
| 13.8 (86)
| Glenferrie Oval
| 10,000
| 14 July 1951
|- bgcolor="#FFFFFF"
| 
| 12.23 (95)
| 
| 10.7 (67)
| Kardinia Park
| 13,500
| 14 July 1951
|- bgcolor="#FFFFFF"
| 
| 15.13 (103)
| 
| 21.9 (135)
| Victoria Park
| 22,000
| 14 July 1951
|- bgcolor="#FFFFFF"
| 
| 11.13 (79)
| 
| 11.16 (82)
| Punt Road Oval
| 15,000
| 14 July 1951
|- bgcolor="#FFFFFF"
| 
| 7.14 (56)
| 
| 9.10 (64)
| Western Oval
| 27,000
| 14 July 1951
|- bgcolor="#FFFFFF"
| 
| 7.9 (51)
| 
| 7.14 (56)
| Lake Oval
| 25,000
| 14 July 1951

Round 12

|- bgcolor="#CCCCFF"
| Home team
| Home team score
| Away team
| Away team score
| Venue
| Crowd
| Date
|- bgcolor="#FFFFFF"
| 
| 9.17 (71)
| 
| 6.9 (45)
| Western Oval
| 20,000
| 21 July 1951
|- bgcolor="#FFFFFF"
| 
| 11.10 (76)
| 
| 4.16 (40)
| Brunswick Street Oval
| 8,000
| 21 July 1951
|- bgcolor="#FFFFFF"
| 
| 9.8 (62)
| 
| 18.11 (119)
| Lake Oval
| 18,000
| 21 July 1951
|- bgcolor="#FFFFFF"
| 
| 8.6 (54)
| 
| 10.14 (74)
| MCG
| 16,000
| 21 July 1951
|- bgcolor="#FFFFFF"
| 
| 6.12 (48)
| 
| 8.8 (56)
| Arden Street Oval
| 14,000
| 21 July 1951
|- bgcolor="#FFFFFF"
| 
| 5.8 (38)
| 
| 7.13 (55)
| Glenferrie Oval
| 14,000
| 21 July 1951

Round 13

|- bgcolor="#CCCCFF"
| Home team
| Home team score
| Away team
| Away team score
| Venue
| Crowd
| Date
|- bgcolor="#FFFFFF"
| 
| 8.8 (56)
| 
| 13.17 (95)
| Punt Road Oval
| 19,000
| 28 July 1951
|- bgcolor="#FFFFFF"
| 
| 16.18 (114)
| 
| 8.11 (59)
| Windy Hill
| 13,000
| 28 July 1951
|- bgcolor="#FFFFFF"
| 
| 18.21 (129)
| 
| 12.10 (82)
| Victoria Park
| 14,000
| 28 July 1951
|- bgcolor="#FFFFFF"
| 
| 8.14 (62)
| 
| 9.11 (65)
| Princes Park
| 34,000
| 28 July 1951
|- bgcolor="#FFFFFF"
| 
| 13.20 (98)
| 
| 10.10 (70)
| Junction Oval
| 10,000
| 28 July 1951
|- bgcolor="#FFFFFF"
| 
| 11.10 (76)
| 
| 4.5 (29)
| Kardinia Park
| 25,500
| 28 July 1951

Round 14

|- bgcolor="#CCCCFF"
| Home team
| Home team score
| Away team
| Away team score
| Venue
| Crowd
| Date
|- bgcolor="#FFFFFF"
| 
| 8.21 (69)
| 
| 6.9 (45)
| Brunswick Street Oval
| 9,000
| 4 August 1951
|- bgcolor="#FFFFFF"
| 
| 16.10 (106)
| 
| 8.12 (60)
| Windy Hill
| 20,000
| 4 August 1951
|- bgcolor="#FFFFFF"
| 
| 11.8 (74)
| 
| 9.14 (68)
| Junction Oval
| 6,000
| 4 August 1951
|- bgcolor="#FFFFFF"
| 
| 10.10 (70)
| 
| 11.15 (81)
| Arden Street Oval
| 14,000
| 4 August 1951
|- bgcolor="#FFFFFF"
| 
| 3.11 (29)
| 
| 4.7 (31)
| Kardinia Park
| 26,500
| 4 August 1951
|- bgcolor="#FFFFFF"
| 
| 9.12 (66)
| 
| 4.9 (33)
| Punt Road Oval
| 17,000
| 4 August 1951

Round 15

|- bgcolor="#CCCCFF"
| Home team
| Home team score
| Away team
| Away team score
| Venue
| Crowd
| Date
|- bgcolor="#FFFFFF"
| 
| 6.12 (48)
| 
| 9.6 (60)
| MCG
| 10,000
| 11 August 1951
|- bgcolor="#FFFFFF"
| 
| 6.15 (51)
| 
| 10.13 (73)
| Glenferrie Oval
| 11,000
| 11 August 1951
|- bgcolor="#FFFFFF"
| 
| 12.9 (81)
| 
| 5.7 (37)
| Victoria Park
| 30,500
| 11 August 1951
|- bgcolor="#FFFFFF"
| 
| 7.19 (61)
| 
| 12.11 (83)
| Princes Park
| 17,500
| 11 August 1951
|- bgcolor="#FFFFFF"
| 
| 14.16 (100)
| 
| 15.9 (99)
| Lake Oval
| 10,000
| 11 August 1951
|- bgcolor="#FFFFFF"
| 
| 4.6 (30)
| 
| 8.9 (57)
| Western Oval
| 22,000
| 11 August 1951

Round 16

|- bgcolor="#CCCCFF"
| Home team
| Home team score
| Away team
| Away team score
| Venue
| Crowd
| Date
|- bgcolor="#FFFFFF"
| 
| 15.16 (106)
| 
| 18.17 (125)
| MCG
| 12,000
| 18 August 1951
|- bgcolor="#FFFFFF"
| 
| 18.15 (123)
| 
| 8.17 (65)
| Windy Hill
| 26,000
| 18 August 1951
|- bgcolor="#FFFFFF"
| 
| 9.12 (66)
| 
| 6.8 (44)
| Victoria Park
| 25,500
| 18 August 1951
|- bgcolor="#FFFFFF"
| 
| 10.11 (71)
| 
| 8.11 (59)
| Arden Street Oval
| 6,000
| 18 August 1951
|- bgcolor="#FFFFFF"
| 
| 9.12 (66)
| 
| 11.15 (81)
| Junction Oval
| 14,000
| 18 August 1951
|- bgcolor="#FFFFFF"
| 
| 13.9 (87)
| 
| 13.9 (87)
| Brunswick Street Oval
| 17,500
| 18 August 1951

Round 17

|- bgcolor="#CCCCFF"
| Home team
| Home team score
| Away team
| Away team score
| Venue
| Crowd
| Date
|- bgcolor="#FFFFFF"
| 
| 18.17 (125)
| 
| 10.12 (72)
| Punt Road Oval
| 14,000
| 25 August 1951
|- bgcolor="#FFFFFF"
| 
| 13.15 (93)
| 
| 3.6 (24)
| Kardinia Park
| 18,000
| 25 August 1951
|- bgcolor="#FFFFFF"
| 
| 11.14 (80)
| 
| 9.10 (64)
| Western Oval
| 14,000
| 25 August 1951
|- bgcolor="#FFFFFF"
| 
| 11.13 (79)
| 
| 7.11 (53)
| Windy Hill
| 30,000
| 25 August 1951
|- bgcolor="#FFFFFF"
| 
| 15.16 (106)
| 
| 8.13 (61)
| Princes Park
| 11,000
| 25 August 1951
|- bgcolor="#FFFFFF"
| 
| 12.9 (81)
| 
| 12.10 (82)
| Lake Oval
| 21,000
| 25 August 1951

Round 18

|- bgcolor="#CCCCFF"
| Home team
| Home team score
| Away team
| Away team score
| Venue
| Crowd
| Date
|- bgcolor="#FFFFFF"
| 
| 13.15 (93)
| 
| 6.12 (48)
| Western Oval
| 24,500
| 1 September 1951
|- bgcolor="#FFFFFF"
| 
| 9.10 (64)
| 
| 16.12 (108)
| Princes Park
| 27,000
| 1 September 1951
|- bgcolor="#FFFFFF"
| 
| 18.16 (124)
| 
| 14.11 (95)
| Punt Road Oval
| 10,000
| 1 September 1951
|- bgcolor="#FFFFFF"
| 
| 5.8 (38)
| 
| 10.10 (70)
| Glenferrie Oval
| 10,000
| 1 September 1951
|- bgcolor="#FFFFFF"
| 
| 11.15 (81)
| 
| 8.13 (61)
| Arden Street Oval
| 12,000
| 1 September 1951
|- bgcolor="#FFFFFF"
| 
| 9.18 (72)
| 
| 10.19 (79)
| Junction Oval
| 16,500
| 1 September 1951

Ladder

Finals

First Semi-Final

Second Semi-Final

Preliminary Final

Grand final

Awards
 The 1951 VFL Premiership team was Geelong.
 The VFL's leading goalkicker was George Goninon of Geelong with 86 goals, including the finals series. John Coleman of Essendon was the leading goalkicker for the home-and-away season with 75 goals.
 The winner of the 1951 Brownlow Medal was Bernie Smith of Geelong with 23 votes.
 Melbourne took the "wooden spoon" in 1951.

Notable events
 The maximum match payment to players permissible under the league's "Coulter Law" was increased from £4-0-0 to £5-0-0 per match.
 The VFL established the Dr. W. C. McClelland Club Trophy, which was awarded on the basis of an aggregate of the performances of all three club teams, week by week, over the entire season. A First Eighteen win was worth 10 points, a Second Eighteen win was worth 4 points, and a Third Eighteen win was worth 2 points. In the case of a drawn match the relevant points are halved.
 In the best performance by a centre half-back since "Duncan's match" in 1927, South Melbourne's centre half-back Ron Clegg took 32 marks in the drawn match against Fitzroy.
 Essendon's full-forward John Coleman was reported for striking Carlton's back-pocket Harry Caspar in the last home and away match of the season. Coleman had scored seven goals during the match. Coleman was suspended for four matches and, as a consequence, he missed the entire final series (see Harry Caspar: "the man who cost Essendon the flag").
 In a desperate effort to cover for the loss of players through suspension, illness and injury, Essendon's coach Dick Reynolds came out of retirement and played in the Grand Final as 20th man. Reynolds came on in the last quarter. He did not score any goals and, when he accidentally bumped into Keith McDonald, he prevented McDonald taking a critical mark.

References
 Maplestone, M., Flying Higher: History of the Essendon Football Club 1872–1996, Essendon Football Club, (Melbourne), 1996. 
 Rogers, S. & Brown, A., Every Game Ever Played: VFL/AFL Results 1897–1997 (Sixth Edition), Viking Books, (Ringwood), 1998. 
 Ross, J. (ed), 100 Years of Australian Football 1897–1996: The Complete Story of the AFL, All the Big Stories, All the Great Pictures, All the Champions, Every AFL Season Reported, Viking, (Ringwood), 1996.

External links
 1951 Season – AFL Tables

Australian Football League seasons
Vfl season